Jørgen Myran (born 24 April 1998 in Oppdal) is a Norwegian curler from Trondheim.

At the national level, he is a 2019 Norwegian men's champion curler.

Teams

Men's

Mixed

Personal life
He started curling in 2008 at the age of 10.

References

External links

Myran, Jørgen | Nordic Junior Curling Tour
Video: 

Living people
1998 births
People from Oppdal
Norwegian male curlers
Norwegian curling champions
Sportspeople from Trondheim
21st-century Norwegian people